Justice is an unincorporated community in eastern Franklin County, North Carolina, United States.

It is located east-southeast of Louisburg, at an elevation of 364 feet (111 m).

The Archibald H. Davis Plantation was listed on the National Register of Historic Places in 1975.

References

Unincorporated communities in Franklin County, North Carolina
Unincorporated communities in North Carolina